Likuni Girls' Secondary School (abbreviated as LGSS) is aCatholic secondary boarding school for girls, located in Lilongwe, Central Region, Malawi. The school, run by the Teresian Sisters, achieves among the highest Malawi School Certificate of Education (MSCE) examination results in the country.

The school has 600 students. In 2015 the telecommunications company Airtel Malawi donated cement to construct a school sports course, as well as 500 chairs for classroom learning. In 2020 the school received a gift of 100 copies of a book about human trafficking by the activist Maxwell Matewere.

In 2009, Mireille Twaigara, a Rwandan refugee at Likuna Girls, achieved among the ten best MSCE results in the country, winning a Zodiak Broadcasting Station award to study medicine in China. In 2019 two students from the school won Zodiak 'Girl Child Awards' for their performance in the 2018 MSCE examinations.

Notable alumni
The Likuni Girls alumni association has undertaken charitable activity on behalf of the elderly in Malawi. Notable alumni include:

 Monica Chakwera, First Lady of Malawi
 Maggie Madimbo, Vice Chancellor of African Bible Colleges
 Mary Shawa, principal secretary in the Ministry of Women and Gender

References

Girls' schools in Africa
Catholic schools in Malawi
Girls boarding schools
High schools and secondary schools in Malawi